Sir John Anderson casualty block is the emergency department of Medical College Kolkata. This block houses, besides the ER, the Emergency Surgery and Emergency Orthopaedics wards and Operation Theatres.

The block is named after Sir John Anderson, 1st Viscount Waverley.

Medical College and Hospital, Kolkata
Emergency medical services in India
Educational institutions in India with year of establishment missing